Sundridge may mean:

 Sundridge, Ontario, a village in Ontario, Canada
 Sundridge, Kent, a village in Kent, England
 Sundridge, London, a suburb in the London Borough of Bromley southeast London
 Sundridge Park railway station, a railway station in the London Borough of Bromley
 Duke of Argyll, who holds a subsidiary title of Baron Sundridge